Lenzen (Elbe) is a small town in the district of Prignitz, in Brandenburg, Germany. The town lies to the north of the Löcknitz River, not far from where the Löcknitz flows into the Elbe. It is part of the Amt Lenzen-Elbtalaue.

Overview

Lenzen is situated near the Elbe, approx. 20 km northwest of Wittenberge. It was the scene of the Battle of Lenzen,  an early victory by the Germans over the Wends in 929. 

Frederick, Count of Zollern, confiscated it from the von Quitzow family in 1420 for their part in the uprising of the Wendish nobility, and mortgaged it to Otto von Blumenthal. He redeemed the mortgage and restored the von Quitzows in 1422.

Another Lenzen is an Old Prussian site in (former) East-Prussia near the Baltic Sea.

Demography

Photogallery

See also
Nausdorf Canal
Battle of Lenzen (929 AD)

References

External links

Localities in Prignitz